Finland competed at the 1960 Summer Olympics in Rome, Italy. 117 competitors, 107 men and 10 women, took part in 92 events in 14 sports.

Medalists

Gold
 Eugen Ekman — Gymnastics, Men's Pommeled Horse

Silver
 Pentti Linnosvuo — Shooting, Rapid-Fire Pistol (Mixed)

Bronze
 Eeles Landström — Athletics, Men's Pole Vault
 Jorma Limmonen — Boxing, Men's Featherweight
 Veli Lehtelä and Toimi Pitkänen — Rowing, Men's Coxless Pairs

Athletics

Boxing

Canoeing

Cycling

Four male cyclists represented Finland in 1960.

Individual road race
 Paul Nyman
 Raimo Honkanen
 Unto Hautalahti
 Matti Herronen

Team time trial
 Paul Nyman
 Unto Hautalahti
 Raimo Honkanen
 Matti Herronen

Sprint
 Paul Nyman

1000m time trial
 Paul Nyman

Diving

Fencing

Six fencers, four men and two women, represented Finland in 1960.

Men's épée
 Rolf Wiik
 Kaj Czarnecki
 Kalevi Pakarinen

Men's team épée
 Kaj Czarnecki, Kurt Lindeman, Rolf Wiik, Kalevi Pakarinen

Women's foil
 Marjatta Moulin
 Barbara Helsingius

Gymnastics

Modern pentathlon

Three male pentathletes represented Finland in 1960.

Individual
 Kurt Lindeman
 Berndt Katter
 Eero Lohi

Team
 Kurt Lindeman
 Berndt Katter
 Eero Lohi

Rowing

Finland had 12 male rowers participate in four out of seven rowing events in 1960.

 Men's single sculls
 Jorma Kortelainen

 Men's coxless pair
 Veli Lehtelä
 Toimi Pitkänen

 Men's coxless four
 Eero Laine
 Heikki Laine
 Pertti Laine
 Arto Nikulainen

 Men's coxed four
 Väinö Huhtala
 Matti Maisala
 Reino Poutanen
 Kauko Hänninen
 Reijo Sundén

Sailing

Shooting

Eight shooters represented Finland in 1980.

25 m pistol
 Pentti Linnosvuo
 Kalle Sievänen

50 m pistol
 Pentti Linnosvuo
 Kaarle Pekkala

300 m rifle, three positions
 Vilho Ylönen
 Esa Kervinen

50 m rifle, three positions
 Esa Kervinen
 Pauli Janhonen

50 m rifle, prone
 Vilho Ylönen
 Jussi Nordqvist

Trap
 Väinö Broman

Swimming

Weightlifting

Wrestling

See also
 Finland at the 1960 Summer Paralympics

References

Nations at the 1960 Summer Olympics
1960
1960 in Finnish sport